August Christoph Carl Vogt (5 July 18175 May 1895) was a German scientist, philosopher, popularizer of science, and politician who emigrated to Switzerland. Vogt published a number of notable works on zoology, geology and physiology. All his life he was engaged in politics, in the German Frankfurt Parliament of 1848–49 and later in Switzerland.

Early life

His maternal uncle was Charles Follen. From 1833 to 1836, he studied medicine at the University of Giessen, and continued his training in Berne, Switzerland, earning his PhD. in 1839. He then worked with Louis Agassiz in Neuchâtel.

Career
In 1847 he became professor of zoology at the University of Giessen, and in 1852 professor of geology and afterwards also of zoology at the University of Geneva. His earlier publications were on zoology. He dealt with the Amphibia (1839), Reptiles (1840), with Mollusca and Crustacea (1845) and more generally with the invertebrate fauna of the Mediterranean (1854). In 1842, during his time with Louis Agassiz, he discovered the mechanism of apoptosis, the programmed cell death, while studying the development of the tadpole of the midwife toad (Alytes obstetricans). Charles Darwin mentions Vogt's support for the theory of evolution in the introduction to his The Descent of Man, and Selection in Relation to Sex (1871).

Vogt was a proponent of scientific materialism and atheism, eager to engage in public debates with philosophical and scientific opponents, such as in his work Köhlerglaube und Wissenschaft of 1855, which was reprinted four times the same year. 

Vogt defended the theory of polygenist evolution; he rejected the monogenist beliefs of most Darwinists and instead believed that each race had evolved from a different type of ape. He wrote the White race was a separate species from Negroes. In Chapter VII of his Lectures on Man (1864), he compared the Negro to the White race and described them as “two extreme human types”. The differences between them, he claimed, are greater than those between two species of ape; and this proved that Negroes are a separate species from Whites. He was elected as a member to the American Philosophical Society in 1869. He died in Geneva at the age of 77.

Politics
Vogt was active in German politics and was a left-wing representative in the Frankfurt Parliament. Karl Marx scathingly replied to attacks by Carl Vogt in his book Herr Vogt (Mister Vogt) in 1860. Marx's defenders pointed to the fact that, years later (1871), records published after the fall of the Second Empire proved that Vogt had been indeed secretly in the pay of the French Emperor.

Honors
The city of Geneva, Switzerland named a boulevard (Boulevard Carl-Vogt) after Vogt and erected a memorial bust in front of a building of the University of Geneva. In September 2022, the university board of the University of Geneva decided to change the name of a university building named after Carl Vogt due to his racist and sexist theories.

Works

 
 An English version of his Lectures on Man: his Place in Creation and in the History of the Earth was published by the Anthropological Society of London in 1864.

Notes

References
 Andreas Daum, Wissenschaftspopularisierung im 19. Jahrhundert: Bürgerliche Kultur, naturwissenschaftliche Bildung und die deutsche Öffentlichkeit, 1848–1914. Munich: Oldenbourg, 1998, .
Fredrick Gregory: Scientific Materialism in Nineteenth Century Germany, Springer, Berlin u.a. 1977,

External links

Short biography and bibliography in the Virtual Laboratory of the Max Planck Institute for the History of Science

1817 births
1895 deaths
German atheists
19th-century German geologists
German physiologists
19th-century German zoologists
members of the Frankfurt Parliament
members of the Second Chamber of the Estates of the Grand Duchy of Hesse
people from Giessen
people from the Grand Duchy of Hesse
Academic staff of the University of Geneva
Academic staff of the University of Giessen